Gruel (also referred to by F-Secure as Fakerr) is a worm first surfaced in 2003 targeting Microsoft Windows platforms (such as Windows 98, Windows ME, Windows 2000 and Windows XP). It spreads via email and file sharing networks.

Symptoms

Arrival and initial launch 

The worm arrives as an attachment with various names in emails claiming to be a security update from either Microsoft or Symantec, depending on the variant. When run, the worm installs itself to the system and displays a fake Windows Error Reporting dialog box, which the user cannot move or close and contains two buttons: "Send Error" and "Send and Close", if the user clicks on the "Send Error" button, the worm mass-mails itself to all the user's contacts and displays fictitious "technical details" about the supposed error report, which contains a Back button and a Close button. Clicking the Back button will return to the original error reporting box, whereas the Close button does not do anything. When the user presses "Send and Close", the worm will disable or terminate Windows Explorer, eject the CD/DVD drive, open many Control Panel options, and then display a dialogue box that cannot be closed, which contains two buttons, "Retry" and "Cancel".

The text of the error message is as follows:

Secondary Payload
After carrying out the above payload, the virus hangs the Operating System, requiring users to perform a Hard boot by forcibly shutting the machine down by cutting the power, then turning the machine back on. Afterwards, the PC is completely unusable, as all .bat, .com, .exe, .ht, .hta, .pif and .scr files have been hooked to the virus itself – by attempting to run any of the programs, the worm is simply activated again and will release its primary payload once more.

See also
 List of computer worms

References

Computer worms